The Mini-Cartridge or Mobile Mini-Cartridge was Intel's  240-pin multi-chip module for their mobile Pentium II processors. It contained the CPU core, as well as separate cache chips and a thermal sensor.

References
 http://www.intel.com/design/packtech/ch_16.pdf

Chip carriers